The Atwot (Reel) are a Nilotic ethnic group of South Sudan who live near Yirol in Eastern Lakes State. They comprise a majority of the population in the payam of Yirol West.

Language 

The Atwot people speak the Atwot language (Atwot: Thok Reel), which was first recognized as a separate language from Dinka by anthropologist John Burton in 1987. It is a Western Nilotic language of the Dinka-Nuer group, closely related to the Nuer language and more distantly to the Luo languages. SIL International estimate that the number of Atuot speakers is 50,000.

Atwot speakers distinguish two dialects to their language, Thok Reel Cieng Luai and Thok Reel Cieng Nhyam with Thok Reel Cieng Nhyam being the more lexically conservative of the two. Most Atwot are bilingual in Dinka and Atwot.

A distinctive feature of the language is its having of three contrastive vowel lengths.

Culture 
The Atwot share much of their culture with their neighbours. Like the Dinka and Nuer, they are also semi-sedentary cattle-herding pastoralists, meaning that while the travel with their herds to grazing grounds, they don't go far from where they had started. There are seven subsections of the Atuot: Jilek, Luac, Jikeyi (Rorkec), Kuek, Apak, Akot and Ajong. The Ajong subsection claims to speak their own dialect known as Thok-ajong, a hard version of Thok Reel. Jikeyi and Kuek speak Thok Reel Cieng Nhyam. The Luac, Jilek, and Akot speak Thok Reel Cieng Luai. The Apak speak Thong Apak which is dialect of South Central Dinka.

Atwot country 
There were approximately 24,700 Atwot at the time of the local dialect survey in 1987. SIL estimates that there were over 50,000 Atwot in 1998. The population of Yirol West in the 2008 Sudanese census was 103,190 although not all inhabitants of the municipality are Atwot.

See also 
 Reel language
 Nilotic peoples
 Demographics of South Sudan
 Geography of South Sudan

References

Bibliography 

Ethnic groups in South Sudan